Guttersnipes (Swedish: Rännstensungar) is a 1944 Swedish drama film directed by Ragnar Frisk and starring Adolf Jahr, Britta Brunius and Lillie Wästfeldt.

The film's sets were designed by the art director Bertil Duroj. It was partly shot on location in Malmö.

Cast
 Adolf Jahr as Johan Fahlen  
 Britta Brunius as Märta Sanner  
 Lillie Wästfeldt as Malina Karlsson  
 Harry Persson as Jaffe  
 Birgitta Hoppeler as Ninni  
 Gunnel Nilsson as Murre  
 Hans Lindgren as Bigge  
 Erik Ahlfors as Janne  
 Per Björkman as Superintendent  
 Bertil Brusewitz as Högstrand  
 Göran Dahlén as Palle  
 Eric Malmberg as Winfelt  
 Josef Norman as Wendel  
 Hilding Rolin as Doctor  
 Stina Ståhle as Mrs. Högstrand  
 Richard Svanström as Gallery Manager  
 Gösta Tönne as Preben  
 Stig Jönsson as Boy  
 Torsten Mårtensson as 'Rolle'  
 Elisabeth Nisborg as 'Pyret'  
 Ivan Nyberg as Boy  
 Kurt Olsson as Boy  
 Kjell Winberg as Boy 
 Bertil Övall as Boy

References

Bibliography 
 John Sundholm. Historical Dictionary of Scandinavian Cinema. Scarecrow Press, 2012.

External links 
 

1944 films
1944 drama films
Swedish drama films
1940s Swedish-language films
Films directed by Ragnar Frisk
Swedish black-and-white films
1940s Swedish films